The New World Centre was a retail-hotel-residential-office complex on Salisbury Road, Tsim Sha Tsui, Kowloon, Hong Kong. It housed two hotels (InterContinental Hong Kong, now closed for renovation in order to rebrand as Regent Hong Kong in 2022, and the now-demolished Renaissance Kowloon), two office towers, a shopping complex and serviced apartments. It was reported to be one of the largest commercial complexes in the world at the time. It used to house a Tokyu Department Store. It was located near the Sogo department store and the Hong Kong Space Museum, opposite the MTR East Tsim Sha Tsui station.

It was closed on 31 March 2010 for demolition. It was replaced by the New World Group's new 63-storey tower and hotel by the Rosewood Hotel Group, and opened in 2019.

Gallery

See also

 New World Development Co. Ltd.
 Victoria Dockside, successor of New World Centre

References

Tsim Sha Tsui
Shopping malls established in 1982
1982 establishments in Hong Kong
Office buildings in Hong Kong
Shopping centres in Hong Kong
New World Development